Tabernacle Baptist Church (also known as Evans Avenue Baptist Church and now Mt Pisgah Missionary Baptist) is a historic church building at 1801 Evans Avenue in Fort Worth, Texas.

It was built in 1923 and added to the National Register of Historic Places in 1999.

See also

National Register of Historic Places listings in Tarrant County, Texas

References

External links

Churches in Fort Worth, Texas
Baptist churches in Texas
Churches on the National Register of Historic Places in Texas
National Register of Historic Places in Fort Worth, Texas
Neoclassical architecture in Texas
Churches completed in 1923
Neoclassical church buildings in the United States